Loic Didavi (born 30 April 1987) is a former Beninese professional tennis player who competed on the ITF Men's Circuit. In September 2004, he achieved a career-high singles world ranking no. 1413. He played for the Benin Davis Cup team.

See also

Benin Davis Cup team

References

External links

1987 births
Living people
Beninese male tennis players